Arvin Transit is the operator of mass transportation in Arvin, California. Four routes operate in and around the city, which serves most of the urban development. There are additional routes which connect Arvin with Lamont, and the Tejon Industrial Complex. There is one transit hub, located at the intersection of Bear Mountain Boulevard and Plumtree Drive.

Service overview 
As of July 2015, Arvin Transit operates 3 fixed routes and a Dial-A-Ride service.  Arvin Local route runs entirely within the city. Arvin – Lamont route runs between Arvin and Lamont, with one express trip on 7:00am and 5 other local trips. Arvin – Tejon route is an express route that runs between Arvin and the Tejon Industrial Complex, which is located next to the Golden State Freeway (Interstate 5). All routes stop at the transit hub. Arvin Transit and Dial-A-Ride service do not operate on most public holidays.

References

External links

Public transportation in Kern County, California
Bus transportation in California